Port Wakefield may refer to.

Australia
Port Wakefield, South Australia, a town and locality
 Port Wakefield railway line, part of the now-closed Balaklava-Moonta railway line in South Australia
Port Wakefield Circuit, a former motor racing circuit in South Australia
Port Wakefield Road, a major highway in South Australia
District Council of Port Wakefield, a former local government area in South Australia

United States
Port Wakefield, Alaska,  a ghost town

See also
Wakefield (disambiguation)